Sir Richard Jenkins  (18 February 1785 – 30 December 1853) was Member of Parliament for Shrewsbury from 1830 to 1832 and from 1837 to 1841. He was also Chairman of the East India Company in 1839.

Personal life
Richard Jenkins was born at Cruckton, near Shrewsbury, the eldest son of Richard Jenkins of Bicton Hall, Shropshire. He married Elizabeth Helen, daughter of Hugh Spottiswoode, of the Honourable East India Company Civil Service, and was the father of Colonel Richard Jenkins of the 1st Bengal Cavalry.

Career
Jenkins was at the Battle of Seetabuldee and also the capture of Nagpur. He served in the Bombay Civil Service from 1800 to 1828 and was the British Resident at Nagpur from 1807 to 1827. He was an East India Company Director from 1832 to 1853.

Honours
Sir Richard was invested as a Knight Grand Cross of the Order of the Bath (GCB) in 1838, and awarded the Third Mahratta War medal.

He was elected a Fellow of the Royal Geographical Society and, in 1841, a Fellow of the Royal Society, for which his candidature citation read that he was a deserving applicant for his "Eminence as a Political Character in India; for his acquaintance with Oriental Literature; for his variable reports to the Government of India; & for his administration of the affairs of Berar"

References

1785 births
1853 deaths
Directors of the British East India Company
British Indian history
Members of the Parliament of the United Kingdom for English constituencies
Fellows of the Royal Society
British military personnel of the Third Anglo-Maratha War
Fellows of the Royal Geographical Society
Knights Grand Cross of the Order of the Bath
UK MPs 1830–1831
UK MPs 1831–1832
UK MPs 1837–1841
19th-century British businesspeople